Dougherty is an unincorporated community in Dawson County, in the U.S. state of Georgia.

History
A post office called Dougherty was established in 1881, and remained in operation until 1955. A variant name was "Savannah". According to one tradition, the community was named after Cornelius Dougherty, a local colonial Irish merchant, while another tradition states the settlement has the name of James Dougherty Sr., a local Cherokee Indian.James was the son of Cornelius Dougherty and his Cherokee wife

References

Unincorporated communities in Dawson County, Georgia
Unincorporated communities in Georgia (U.S. state)